Going Overboard is a 1989 American comedy film directed by Valerie Breiman, and stars Adam Sandler in his film debut, Burt Young, Allen Covert, Billy Zane, Terry Moore, Milton Berle and Billy Bob Thornton in a small role. The film was originally released in 1989, but once Sandler became successful after appearing on Saturday Night Live and starring in the film Billy Madison, it was given a wider release by Vidmark Entertainment in 1995.

Plot
Shecky Moskowitz (Adam Sandler) is a struggling comedian working on a cruise ship. Shecky gets his chance to be the ship's comedian when it is thought that the regular comedian, Dickie Diamond (Scott LaRose), had fallen overboard and drowned. (Dickie actually locked himself in the men's room.) Shecky is nervous about performing, but King Neptune (Billy Zane) convinces him to go for the opportunity by telling Shecky about the power of laughter. Shecky's first performance is very unsuccessful as he is booed off the stage, he is especially heckled by the construction worker Dave (Billy Bob Thornton). However, after a lecture by Milton Berle, Shecky succeeds in making the audience laugh. At that point, the terrorists come on board and want to kill Miss Australia. Shecky, remembering the advice about the power of laughter, saves her by promising to put the assassins in a film.

Cast
 Adam Sandler as Shecky Moskowitz
 Burt Young as General Noriega
 Tom Hodges as Bob
 Scott LaRose as Dickie Diamond
 Allen Covert as The Bartender
 Billy Zane as King Neptune
 Terry Moore as Mistress
 Milton Berle (credited) as himself
 Billy Bob Thornton as Dave
 Dan Povenmire as Yellow Teeth guitarist
 Steven Brill as Priest
 Peter Berg as Mort Ginsberg
 Adam Rifkin as Croaker / Miss Spain
 Gabe Sachs as Funeral Moaner
 Ricky Paull Goldin as Terrorist Without Shirt
 Warren Selko as Terrorist With Mustache

Production
Producer Randolf Turrow came up with the idea after he was asked to judge a beauty pageant in Palm Springs, Florida and learned that the pageant promoters rented a cruise ship filled with beauty contest winners as a publicity stunt. Turrow decided that this gave him a good opportunity to make a film, so he contacted a friend in Texas, Mark Schultz, to finance the film. Turrow contacted Valerie Berman a week before filming began to write the script. The project went from concept to completion in three months. It was written in three days, cast in one day, prepared in two days and filmed in six days, with two additional days for pick-up shots. The cruise ship denied the filmmakers permission to use any of the public areas with passengers present, so all the shots on common areas were either shot at night or when the passengers were off the ship. The filmmakers then hired some of the onboard staff to be the extras. The film was put together so quickly that the crew forgot the correct lenses so they had to shoot on incorrect lenses, which is noticeable in some shots.

Release
The film was first released regionally, as The Unsinkable Shecky Moskowitz, on October 27, 1989. It made its television debut in June 1990 on USA Up All Night and was retitled Babes Ahoy. It was finally released on video in the U.S. in 1995 as Going Overboard, one week after the video release of Billy Madison.

Reception
On Rotten Tomatoes the film has 4 reviews listed, all of which are negative.

David Nusair of Reel Film Reviews gave it 0 out of 4 and called it "...a slapdash and thoroughly amateurish piece of work that suffers from a total dearth of positive attributes."
J.R. Taylor of Entertainment Weekly gave it a grade D.

References

External links
 
 

1989 films
1989 comedy films
1989 directorial debut films
1980s sex comedy films
American comedy films
American sex comedy films
1980s English-language films
Films set on ships
Films shot in New Orleans
Films with screenplays by Adam Sandler
Lionsgate films
Seafaring films
Trimark Pictures films
1980s American films